True color may refer to:
 True color (rendering), the rendition of an object's natural colors through an image
 True color (24-bit), the use of 24 bits to store color information
 True color, a scale used to determine the color of water after all suspended material has been filtered out

See also
 True Colors (disambiguation)